The Arafundi languages are a small family of clearly related languages in East Sepik Province, Papua New Guinea. They are conjectured to be related to the Piawi and Madang languages. They are named after the Arafundi River.

Alfendio is an old synonym for Arafundi, from when it was still considered a single language.

Languages
The Arafundi languages form a dialect continuum where language boundaries are blurred.

The Arafundi languages are,

Nanubae
Tapei
Andai (Meakambut)
Awiakay (Karamba)

Kassell, et al. (2018) recognize Andai, Nanubae, and Tapei.

Foley (2018) cites Hoenigman (2015) for 'Upper Arafundi' and 'Lower Arafundi', as well as listing Awiakay and 'Imboin'. However, the scope of these names is somewhat confused. Usher notes, 

An Enga-based pidgin is also used by speakers of Arafundi languages.

Classification
Laycock (1973) grouped the Arafundi languages with the Ramu languages, although (according to his comments in the introduction) this grouping was apparently impressionistic and not based on either reconstructive work or lexicostatistics. Ross (2005) retains Laycock's grouping without comment. However, Foley (2005) does not include Arafundi within Ramu, and Ethnologue (2009) shows them as an independent family. Foley has suggested instead that the Arafundi and Piawi languages may be related (Comrie 1992), a position confirmed by Timothy Usher.

Proto-language
Some lexical reconstructions of Proto-Arafundi River by Usher (2020) are:

{| class="wikitable sortable"
! gloss !! Proto-Arafundi River
|-
| head || *kopa
|-
| hair/feather(s) || *tum[a]
|-
| ear || *kund[a]
|-
| nose || *pok
|-
| tooth || *kandz[a]
|-
| tongue || *taTumat[a]
|-
| foot/leg || *panamb[a]
|-
| blood || *kombet-
|-
| bone || *jekimb[a]
|-
| skin || *kumb[a]-; *tut[a]
|-
| breast || *ji[t/s]
|-
| louse || *emuŋg
|-
| dog || *tawa[m/mb]
|-
| pig || *jat
|-
| bird || *kenet
|-
| egg || *mund[a]
|-
| tree || *jes
|-
| man || *nuŋgum
|-
| woman || *nam
|-
| sun || *kVjom
|-
| moon || *kepa
|-
| water || *jomb
|-
| fire || *jamb
|-
| stone || *naŋgum
|-
| name || *membi[a]
|-
| eat/drink || *nembV-
|-
| two || *kamin, *kondamin
|}

See also
Yimas-Arafundi Pidgin

References

 Comrie, Bernard. "The recognition of the Piawi language family." In Tom Dutton, Malcolm Ross and Darrell Tryon, eds. The language game: Papers in memory of Donald C. Laycock. 111-113. Canberra: Pacific Linguistics, 1992.
 
 Laycock, Donald. Sepik languages - checklist and preliminary classification. Pacific Linguistics B-25. Canberra, 1973.

External links
Arafundi languages database at TransNewGuinea.org
Arafundi River. New Guinea World.

 
Upper Yuat languages
Languages of East Sepik Province